The men's shot put event  at the 1999 IAAF World Indoor Championships was held on March 5.

Results

References
Results

Shot
Shot put at the World Athletics Indoor Championships